Mirificarma fasciata is a moth of the family Gelechiidae. It is found in Spain.

References

Moths described in 1984
Mirificarma
Moths of Europe